Šmarjeta pri Celju is a settlement in the City Municipality of Celje in eastern Slovenia. It lies on the Hudinja River in the northern outskirts of Celje. The area is part of the traditional region of Styria. It is now included with the rest of the municipality in the Savinja Statistical Region.

Name
The name of the settlement was changed from Sveta Marjeta (literally, 'Saint Margaret') to Šmarjeta pri Celju in 1964. The name was changed on the basis of the 1948 Law on Names of Settlements and Designations of Squares, Streets, and Buildings as part of efforts by Slovenia's postwar communist government to remove religious elements from toponyms.

History
Early settlement of the area is attested by the remains of Roman structures, including a well. The foundation of a wealthier Roman house was discovered on the western edge of the settlement, at Janžek Hill. In the middle ages, together with neighboring Škofja Vas, Šmarjeta pri Celju was feudal property under the domain of the bishops of Gurk. The territory changed hands several times later. Fichtenhof manor formerly stood next to the church. The church estate was eventually sold to the convent at Mekinje, then purchased by Dean Jožef von Jakomini (1755–1830) at Nova Cerkev, who in turn sold it in 1802 to nobility living in Slovenske Konjice.

Mass grave
Šmarjeta pri Celju is the site of a mass grave associated with the Second World War. It is part of the 25 mass graves in the Celje area. The two graves at the site contain the remains of nine German prisoners of war and 10 Russian Cossack prisoners of war, respectively.

References

External links
Šmarjeta pri Celju on Geopedia

Populated places in the City Municipality of Celje